Esteban Lucas Bridges (December 31, 1874, Ushuaia – April 4, 1949, Buenos Aires) was an Anglo-Argentine author, explorer, and rancher.  After fighting for the British during World War I, he married and moved with his wife to South Africa, where they developed a ranch with her brother. 

He was the third child of six and second son of Anglican missionary Reverend Thomas Bridges (1842–98) and "the third white native of Ushuaia" (his elder brother, born in 1872, having been the first) in Tierra del Fuego, Argentina, at the southernmost tip of South America. He wrote Uttermost Part of the Earth (1948) about his family's experiences in Tierra del Fuego, but it was particularly about the Yahgan and Selk'nam indigenous peoples and the effects on them of colonization by Europeans.

Early life and education
Stephen Lucas Bridges, also called Esteban and going by Lucas, was born to Thomas and Mary Ann Bridges in Ushuaia, Tierra del Fuego. The third of six children and the second of three sons, he grew up speaking English, Yahgan, and Selk'nam. Their father was an Anglican missionary who ministered to the indigenous Yahgan and Ona peoples.

Lucas Bridges learned the languages and cultures of both tribes from a young age. He was the only European to be made a blood brother of the Selk'nam and invited to witness their council. He also compiled a vocabulary of the Haush or Manek'enk, a small indigenous tribe located to the east of the Selk'nam, at the end of Mitre Peninsula.

Bridges witnessed the effects of change as immigrants from European cultures flooded the area beginning in the late 19th century. There were gold and sheep booms in the region, attracting many new immigrants. The indigenous peoples were decimated.

Eurasian infectious diseases such as measles caused high fatality rates. Outbreaks in 1884 (following a visit by three Argentine Navy ships), 1924 and 1929 became fatal epidemics for the indigenous peoples, with devastating results. The Ona and Haush became extinct in the 20th century, and the number of Yahgan much reduced.  

In 1886, his father resigned his position as missionary. After the government gave his father a large grant of land, Lucas helped him build Estancia Harberton (named after his mother's hometown in England), the residence of a sheep ranch, in a sheltered bay on the coast of the Beagle Channel. The location was chosen by the Yahgan as a safe port.

Exploration
In 1898 the younger Bridges opened a trail north from Harberton to the east end of Lago Fagnano, where the land was better for rearing sheep. It has been improved as a hiking trail, known as the Lucas Bridges Trail. 

In 1902 Lucas and his brothers Despard and Will founded Estancia Viamonte in the northern part of Tierra del Fuego. The new trail was used to transport sheep between the two estancias. The Ona people had asked for their help in finding a place of shelter from some of the pressures they were under. The Bridges provided them with areas on their estancias where they could live traditionally. Descendants of the brothers continue to live and work at the estancias.

World War I and migration
Bridges went to England to enlist in the army to fight in World War I. In 1917 he married Jannette McLeod Jardine (1890-1976).  After the war, the young couple moved to South Africa, where he developed a ranch with his brother-in-law. He and his wife raised their family there.

After decades, Bridges returned to Argentina, where he lived out his last years. He died in Buenos Aires in 1949 and is buried next to his father in the British Cemetery at Chacarita, Buenos Aires.

References

Sources
 "Obituary: Lucas Bridges", The Geographical Journal 114 (1949) pp. 240–241.
 Bridges, Lucas, Uttermost Part of the Earth, originally published by Hodder & Stoughton, London, 1948. Re-issued, with an introduction by Gavin Young, Century, London, 1987, . Page numbers cited refer to the later edition. Republished 2008, Overlook Press  — Exact date of birth, position in family, etc.: p. 67. Father's dates: p. 538. Father's intermittent visits to, and residence in, Falkland Islands and Tierra del Fuego: pp. 42–58. Argentine Navy visit and establishing a sub-prefecture at Ushuaia: pp. 122–3. Outbreaks and effects of measles: pp. 125–7, 136, 520, 532. Indigenous population levels: p. 521.

1874 births
1949 deaths
People from Ushuaia
Argentine people of British descent
Burials at La Chacarita Cemetery
History of Tierra del Fuego
Argentine emigrants to South Africa
Argentine expatriates in the United Kingdom